Claver is a Spanish surname. Notable people with the surname include:

Francisco Claver (1926–2010), Filipino priest
Peter Claver (1581–1654), Spanish priest
Víctor Claver (born 1988), Spanish basketball player

See also
Mauricio Claver-Carone, American political advocate
Claver, Surigao del Norte, a municipality in the Philippines

Spanish-language surnames